Carbonara Scrivia is a comune (municipality) in the Province of Alessandria in the Italian region Piedmont, located about  east of Turin and about  southeast of Alessandria.

Carbonara Scrivia borders the following municipalities: Spineto Scrivia, Tortona, and Villaromagnano.

References

Cities and towns in Piedmont